The Perry Nuclear Power Plant is located on a  site on Lake Erie,  northeast of Cleveland in North Perry, Ohio, US. The nuclear power plant is owned and operated by Energy Harbor (Formerly FirstEnergy Solutions).

The reactor is a General Electric BWR-6 boiling water reactor design, with a Mark III containment design. The original core power level of 3,579 megawatts thermal was increased to 3,758 megawatts thermal in 2000, making Perry one of the largest BWRs in the United States.

Perry was expected to close in 2021 as it is no longer profitable to run when competing against natural gas plants. To avert this, Ohio House Bill 6 was signed into law in July 2019 which added a fee to residents' utility bills that funded subsidies of $150 million per year to Perry and the Davis–Besse nuclear plant to keep both plants operational. However, the bill was alleged to be part of the Ohio nuclear bribery scandal revealed by the United States Department of Justice (DOJ) in July 2020.

History
Perry was originally designed as a two-unit installation, but construction on Unit 2 was suspended in 1985 and formally cancelled in 1994. At the time of cancellation, all of the major buildings and structures for the second unit were completed, including the  cooling tower. It is possible that a second unit could be constructed on the site, but current economic and regulatory conditions are not conducive to doing so (in addition to back taxes that would be due to the "abandon in place" designations on many objects in Unit 2).

Eleven hundred acres at the Perry plant were designated in 1993 as an urban wildlife sanctuary by the National Institute for Urban Wildlife. The area has trees, shrubs, streams and ponds; and a habitat for heron, belted kingfisher, ducks and geese. The forested area is ideal for the crane-fly orchid, a rare species in Ohio. The site includes a wetland that contains spotted turtles, an endangered species in Ohio.

On March 28, 2010, there was a fire in a lubrication system for one of the water pumps that feeds water for generation of steam. Reactor power automatically lowered to 68% due to the reduction in feed water flow, and the fire was extinguished in less than three hours. Two plant fire brigade personnel were brought to a local hospital for "heat stress" following the fire. No customers lost power during this event. On February 9, 2016, the plant was unexpectedly shut down for maintenance to a recirculation pump. The reactor was brought back to full power by February 20, 2016.

In addition to Perry, Energy Harbor also owns and operates the Davis-Besse and Beaver Valley nuclear plants.

Electricity Production

Surrounding population

The 2010 U.S. population within  of Perry was 83,410, an increase of 8 percent in a decade, according to an analysis of U.S. Census data for msnbc.com. The 2010 U.S. population within  was 2,281,531, a decrease of 3.0 percent since 2000. Cities within  include Cleveland ( to city center). Canadian population is not included in these figures.

Seismic risk
The Nuclear Regulatory Commission's estimate of the risk each year of an earthquake intense enough to cause core damage to the reactor at Perry was 1 in 47,619, according to an NRC study published in August 2010.

Security threats 
At around 6:00pm EDT on April 7, 2021, the FBI's Cleveland Field Office tweeted that there was an ongoing security situation at the plant that necessitated a bomb squad.  The following day, law enforcement disclosed that a 33-year-old Michigan man drove to the power plant and told plant security officers that there was a bomb in the trailer he was towing with his pickup truck.  No bomb was found; the man was arrested.

References

External links

Energy infrastructure completed in 1987
Buildings and structures in Lake County, Ohio
Nuclear power plants in Ohio
FirstEnergy